Sheshrao Apparao Deshmukh was a member of 6th Lok Sabha of India from Parbhani parliamentary constituency of Maharashtra. He was also first member of legislative assembly (MLA) of Maharashtra from Parbhani Vidhan Sabha Constituency from 1962 to 1967.

He was known for his clean image. He is known as "Architect of Parbhani City" because of his various developmental work done during his term as corporator in Parbhani Municipal Council and also as MLA and MP.
Mr Sheshrao Deshmukh also represented
member of legislative assembly (MLA) of Maharashtra from Jintur Vidhan Sabha Constituency
from 1972 to 1977.
He was strong leader of Peasants and Workers Party of India  from Marathwada Region.

References

2015 deaths
People from Parbhani district
Parbhani district
People from Marathwada
India MPs 1977–1979
Lok Sabha members from Maharashtra
1930 births